"Bruce" is a song by Australian musician Rick Springfield. The song appeared on his 1984 album, Beautiful Feelings. The song reached No. 27 on the U.S. Billboard Hot 100.

Song background 

The song was originally recorded in 1978, earlier in Springfield's career. At the time, he was commonly confused with New Jersey musician Bruce Springsteen. The song is a comedic take on this predicament: the lyrics include a description of a romantic encounter with a woman who calls him "Bruce" during sex, as well as an encounter with a fan who expresses an affinity for Born to Run.

Cash Box called it "a hard rocking and humorous lament over being mistaken for Bruce Springsteen."

Chart performance

References

External links
 

Rick Springfield songs
1978 songs
1984 singles
Songs written by Rick Springfield
Bruce Springsteen